Boris Borisov was a Russian actor. Honored Artist of the RSFSR.

Selected filmography 
 1911 — Defence of Sevastopol
 1915 — Leon Drey

References

External links 
 Борис Борисов on kino-teatr.ru

Russian male film actors
20th-century Russian male actors
1872 births
1939 deaths